Jordan Foote (born 2 January 1996) is a former professional Australian rules footballer who played for the Sydney Swans in the Australian Football League (AFL). He was drafted by the Sydney Swans with their third selection and fifty-second overall in the 2015 rookie draft. He made his debut in the six point win against  in round 18, 2016 at the Sydney Cricket Ground.

Foote was delisted at the end of the 2018 AFL season. Jordan was a member of the 2020 SANFL Grand Final playing for the Woodville-West Torrens winning side against the North Adelaide Football Club. He was also awarded the Jack Oatey Medal for being the best on ground.

References

External links

1996 births
Living people
Sydney Swans players
Australian rules footballers from New South Wales
Woodville-West Torrens Football Club players